Leptobrotula breviventralis is a species of cusk-eel found in the Indian Ocean off the coast of Africa and in the Pacific Ocean around the Hawaiian Islands. This species grows to a length of  SL. It is the only known member of its genus.

References

Ophidiidae
Monotypic fish genera
Fish described in 1986